Songshan Road Subdistrict is a subdistrict of Erqi District, in the heart of Zhengzhou, Henan, People's Republic of China. , it has 13 residential communities under its administration.

See also
List of township-level divisions of Henan

References

Township-level divisions of Henan